Yasynuvata is a city in Donetsk Oblast (province) of south-eastern Ukraine. Administratively, it is incorporated as a city of oblast significance. It also serves as the administrative center of the Yasynuvata Raion, though it does not belong to the raion. It is located 21 km from Donetsk, the administrative center of the Donetsk Oblast. Yasynuvata is a large railway crossroad.

History 
Starting mid-April 2014 pro-Russian separatists captured several towns and cities across in Donetsk and Luhansk Districts; including Yasynuvata. On 17 August 2014, Ukrainian forces reportedly took the city from the pro-Russian separatists. But fighting for control of the city continued. On 19 August Ukrainian troops claimed they were clearing Yasynuvata of remaining separatist forces after its victory ("conducting a mopping-up operation"). Ukrainian military was forced to retreat from the town in mid-September 2014, and since then the Government of Ukraine have recognised it to be under Russian occupation. On 30 September 2022, Russian Federation unilaterally annexed Yasynuvata with other areas of Donetsk Oblast that are under Russian military occupation.

Due to the war situation railway operation has ceased in 2014.

According to the OSCE the area between Yasynuvata and neighboring Ukrainian army controlled Avdiivka is one of the hotspots of the War in Donbass.

Demographics 
As of the 2001 Ukrainian census:

Ethnicity
 Ukrainians: 68.9%
 Russians: 28.7%
 Belarusians: 0.6%
 Armenians: 0.4%

Notable people
 Mykola Skrypnyk
 Iryna Dovhan
 Nikolai Gritsenko

References

External links
 Yasynuvata city administration website
 Yasynuvata city portal

Cities in Donetsk Oblast
Yekaterinoslav Governorate
Cities of regional significance in Ukraine
Populated places established in the Russian Empire
Donetsk Raion